Yves Hermann Ekwala (born May 9, 1990 or 9 July 1985) is a Cameroonian professional footballer  who plays as a forward within the China League One club Dalian Transcendence's organization.

Club career
Hermann began his professional career with top tier Cameroonian side Union Douala in 2009. He joined Thai Premier League club Buriram United in 2011 and would have a successful period with the team by winning the league and FA Cup with them.

He signed a contract with China League One side Chongqing Lifan on 22 January 2013.
He moved to another League One club Qingdao Hainiu in January 2014.

He was moved to the reserve squad of Dalian Transcendence on 15 July 2018.

References

Eurosport

External links

Living people
Cameroonian footballers
Association football forwards
Yves Ekwalla Herman
Chongqing Liangjiang Athletic F.C. players
Qingdao F.C. players
Guizhou F.C. players
Xinjiang Tianshan Leopard F.C. players
Dalian Transcendence F.C. players
Yves Ekwalla Herman
China League One players
Cameroonian expatriate footballers
Cameroonian expatriate sportspeople in Thailand
Cameroonian expatriate sportspeople in China
Expatriate footballers in Thailand
Expatriate footballers in China
1985 births